To Leave or Die in Long Island is the second release by the DIY collective Bomb The Music Industry!. It is considered a "mini-album" by the band members, being too long to be an EP but not long enough to be a full-length.

The album was released by Asbestos Records on vinyl in December 2006, after a delay due to a manufacturing error. The first pressing consists of three versions on vinyl, and a limited edition picture disc.

Track listing
All songs written by Jeff Rosenstock.

Details
"Congratulations, John, On Joining Every Time I Die" is about BtMI! guitarist/bass player John DeDomenici, who singer/guitarist Jeff Rosenstock thought was going to quit BtMI! to join metalcore band Every Time I Die. He did not. The line "1, 2, 3, 1, 2, 3, Pick it up, 1, 2, 3" in the bridge is an homage to the Every Time I Die song "Off Broadway", but the actual lyric in the song is "keep it up", not pick it up.

The sample at the beginning of "Showerbeers" is from the movie Can't Hardly Wait.

"Bomb the Music Industry! (and Action Action) (and Refused) (and Born Against) Are Fucking Dead" contains a sample from the British sitcom The Office.

"Brian Wilson Says SMiLE! (a.k.a. Beard of Defiance)" uses a sample from The SpongeBob SquarePants Movie.

References

External links
To Leave or Die in Long Island on Quote Unquote Records

Bomb the Music Industry! albums
2005 albums
Albums free for download by copyright owner